The Bujang Valley is a sprawling historical complex and has an area of approximately  situated near Merbok, Kedah, between Gunung Jerai in the north and Muda River in the south. It is the richest archaeological area in Malaysia.

These archaeological remains show that there was a Buddhist polity here. In Sanskrit the term bhujanga refer to serpent, thus the name itself is roughly translated into "Serpent Valley". The area consists of ruins that may date more than 2,535 years old. More than fifty ancient pagoda temples, called candi (pronounced as "chandi"), have also been unearthed. The most impressive and well-preserved of these is located in Pengkalan Bujang, Merbok. The Bujang Valley Archaeological Museum is also located that known as Sungai Batu, excavations have revealed jetty remains, iron-smelting sites, and a clay brick monument dating back to AD 110, making it the oldest man-made structure to be recorded in Southeast Asia.

The local rulers adopted Hindu-Buddhist Indian cultural and political models earlier than those of Kutai in eastern Borneo, in southern Celebes or Tarumanegara in western Java, where remains showing Indian influence have been found dating from the early 5th century. Relics found in the Bujang Valley are now on display at the archaeological museum. Items include inscribed stone caskets and tablets, metal tools and ornaments, ceramics, pottery, and Hindu icons.

For the past two decades, students from universities around Malaysia have been invited for research and have done their graduate works at the Valley. Much of the historical links is still vague considering not many of the scriptures and writings survive. Even the temples did not survive the onslaught of age because their wooden roofing has rotted and withered over the past 1,200 years. The museum itself is inadequate and not organised, much of the findings are elsewhere scattered from Museum Negara to Singapore (which once formed a part of Malaysia). Folk stories and oral history also provide place for a magnificent kingdom of jewels and gold. Outside peninsular and insular Southeast Asia, oral history in India suggests the presence of golden chariots and jewels in hidden caves at Bujang Valley and Mount Jerai. Some visitors to the antiquity department at Muzium Negara has eyewitness accounts of magnificent objects such as a 10-feet-tall Raja Bersiung Throne and various idols and items from the Valley.

In 2013, it was reported that, a 1,200-year-old Hindu Temple at the site, identified as Candi No. 11, had been demolished by a land developer. Candi 11 was one of the most ancient of the Old Kedah kingdom and was amongst 17 registered candi. In the face of public criticism, the Kedah State Government sought to deflect blame by claiming that it was powerless to do anything because the land was privately owned and further, that the site had not been gazetted as a historical site. After the controversy, the Tourism and Heritage Ministry has agreed to consider gazetting the Bujang Valley as heritage site 

Before the 1970s, the research in Bujang Valley was done by western archaeologists, the most prominent ones include H.G. Quaritch Wales, Dorothy Wales, and Alastair Lamb. After the 1970s, local archaeologists were trained to continue the research, excavations and reconstructions of sites were done by National University of Malaysia and University of Malaya in collaboration with National Museum. The most prominent local archaeologist who did research in the Bujang Valley was Nik Hassan Shuhaimi Nik Abdul Rahman who wrote and publish countless books and articles on this topic. He introduced a periodisation of the history of Bujang Valley as well as a theory which explains about the process of indigenisation of the Indian Culture which formed the socio-economic make up of the polity. Other earlier local archaeologist who significantly contributed to the research of Bujang Valley include from Leong Sau Heng, Mohd Supian Sabtu, Kamarudin Zakaria, and Zulkifli Jaafar. After 2008, The Centre for Global Archaeological Research (CGAR) from University Sains Malaysia, led by Mohd Mokhtar Saidin explored a new archaeological complex which reveals dozens of new sites, said to be dated from 2nd CE.

The Bujang Valley is currently in the process of being nominated by Malaysia into the UNESCO World Heritage List since 2013. In 2017, the government announced that they will make more research and conservation efforts in the valley to preserve its outstanding universal value. The site's inclusion to the world heritage list is backed by diplomats from India, Indonesia, Thailand, Cambodia, Vietnam, Singapore, the Philippines, Timor-Leste, Bangladesh, Japan, Bhutan, Nepal, Myanmar, Laos, Brunei, Papua New Guinea, Maldives, and Sri Lanka.

History

Claudius Ptolemaeus (Greek: Κλαύδιος Πτολεμαῖος; c. 90 – c. 168), known in English as Ptolemy, was a Greek geographer, astronomer, and astrologer who had written about Golden Chersonese, which indicates trade with India and China has existed since the 1st century AD.

As early as the 1st century AD, Southeast Asia was the place of a network of coastal city-states, the centre of which was the ancient Khmer Funan kingdom in the south of what is now Vietnam. This network encompassed the southern part of the Indochinese peninsula and the western part of the Indonesian archipelago. These coastal cities had a continuous trade as well as tributary relation with China from very early period, at the same time being in constant contact with Indian traders.

The rulers of the western part of Indonesia adopted Indian cultural and political models e.g. proof of such Indian influence on Indonesian art in the 5th century, i. e. an Amaravati Buddha statue found in southern Sulawesi and a Sanskrit inscription found east of Jakarta. Three inscriptions found in Palembang (South Sumatra) and on Bangka Island, written in a form of Malay and in an alphabet derived from the Pallava script, are proof that these "Indonesians" had definitely adopted Indian models while maintaining their indigenous language and social system. These inscriptions reveal the existence of a Dapunta Hyang (lord) of Srivijaya who led an expedition against his enemies and who curses those who will not obey his law.

Being on the maritime route between China and South India, the Malay peninsula was involved in this trade The Bujang Valley, being strategically located at the northwest entrance of the Strait of Malacca as well as facing the Bay of Bengal, was continuously frequented by Chinese and south Indian traders. Such was proven by the discovery of trade ceramics, sculptures, inscriptions and monuments dated from the 5th to 14th century CE. The Bujang Valley was continuously administered by different thalassocratical powers including Funan, Srivijaya and Majapahit before the trade declined.

Kedah inscriptions

In Kedah there are remains showing Buddhist and Hindu influences which has been known for about a century now from the discoveries reported by Col. Low and has recently been subjected to a fairly exhaustive investigation by Dr. Quaritch Wales.

An inscribed stone bar, rectangular in shape, bears the ye-dharma hetu formula in Pallava script of the 7th century, thus proclaiming the Buddhist character of the shrine near the find-spot (site I) of which only the basement survives. It is inscribed on three faces in 6th century, possibly earlier. Except for the Cherok To'kun Inscription which was engraved on a large boulder, other inscriptions discovered in Bujang Valley are comparatively small in size and probably were brought in by Buddhist pilgrimage or traders.

UNESCO Proposal
UNESCO made a report in 1987 endorsing the site. In 2014, some ruins of candi (temples) in Bujang were destroyed by an urban developer, causing an international outcry against attacks on cultural heritage. In 2017, the government of Malaysia announced that more research on the site is still needed, thus excluding it from the Malaysian tentative list. The government also said that Bujang's Merbok Museum and Pengkalan Bujang held historical significance to the site.

Books
 Michel Jacq-Hergoualc'h, The Malay Peninsula, Crossroads of the Maritime Silk Road, 2002, Brill, Leiden, 
 Wolters, O. W., Early Indonesian Commerce : a Study of the Origins, 2001, 1597401870
 Wolters, O. W., Early Southeast Asia : selected essays, Cornell University, 2008,  / 0-87727-773-7
 Wolters, O. W., The Fall of Srivijaya in Malay History, Cornell University Press, 1970,

See also
 Candi of Indonesia
 Early History of Kedah
 Indonesian Esoteric Buddhism
 Langkasuka
 Mahanavika Buddhagupta
 Red Earth Kingdom / Chi Tu
 Sungai Batu

References

News articles

External links
 
 Bujang Valley Eco Tourism Management – Bujang Valley
 Tourism Malaysia – Bujang Valley
 The Ancient Kingdom of Bujang Valley
 Bujang Valley Archaeological Museum, Bukit Batu Pahat
 Lembah Bujang: Kingdom lost . kingdom found

History of Kedah
Indianized kingdoms
Pre-Muslim kingdoms in Malaysian history
Archaeological sites in Malaysia